was a Japanese voice actress who was born in Aichi Prefecture and was affiliated with Aoni Production at the time of her death. Suzuki's last film was Pokémon: Jirachi Wishmaker (where she voiced the protagonist Pokémon: Jirachi), released only a week and half after Suzuki's death from a heart attack on July 7, 2003, at the age of 47.

Filmography
 Maeterlinck's Blue Bird: Tyltyl and Mytyl's Adventurous Journey - Spirit of the Sugar (1980)
 Ikkyū-san – Mokunen (1975–1982)
 Miss Machiko – Hiroshi (1981–1983)
 Captain Tsubasa – Yayoi Aoba (1983–1986)
 Fist of the North Star – Lin (1984–1986)
 Ganbare, Kickers! - Kakeru Daichi (1986-1987)
 Dragon Ball – Additional Voices (1986–1989)
 Dragon Ball: Curse of the Blood Rubies – Pansy (1986)
 Saint Seiya – Yakov (Jacob, Hyoga's young friend) (1986–1990)
 Dragon Ball Z – Dende, Marron, Bee (1989–1996)
 Dragon Ball GT – Marron (1996–1997)
 Transformers: The Headmasters – Daniel Witwicky (1987–1988)
 Pokémon: Jirachi Wishmaker'' – Jirachi (2003)

References

External links
 Aoni Production profile

1956 births
2003 deaths
Japanese voice actresses
Voice actresses from Aichi Prefecture
Aoni Production voice actors